Modular Presents: Leave Them All Behind 2 is the 2007 double-disc follow-up to Modular Recordings' 2005 dance-rock compilation Modular Presents: Leave Them All Behind. Similar to that compilation, Disc 1 is mixed while Disc 2 is unmixed.

Track listing
Disc 1
 "Let's Make Love And Listen To Death From Above" by Cansei de Ser Sexy – 2:15
 "Standing In The Way Of Control" by The Gossip – 2:53
 "Sister Self Doubt" by The Shakes – 2:06
 "The Boy Who Ran Away (Riton Re-Rub)" by Mystery Jets – 3:02
 "Skip To The End (Digitalism Re-Rub)" by The Futureheads – 4:36
 "Gravity's Rainbow (Van She Remix)" by Klaxons – 2:39
 "Woman (MSTRKRFT Remix)" by Wolfmother – 3:27
 "Are You The One? (Club Mix)" by The Presets – 3:12
 "Street Justice" by MSTRKRFT – 3:15
 "Let My Shoes Lead Me Forward (The Knife Remix)" by Jenny Wilson – 2:57
 "Cheated Hearts (Peaches Remix)" by Yeah Yeah Yeahs – 1:32
 "Waters Of Nazareth" by Justice – 4:08
 "Going Nowhere (Sebastian Remix)" by Cut Copy – 1:25
 "K-Hole" by Ali Love – 3:11
 "The Chills" by Peter Bjorn and John – 2:23
 "Gold Lion" by Yeah Yeah Yeahs – 3:04
 "Talk Talk Talk Talk" by Love Is All – 1:54
 "Change Channel" by Lo-Fi-Fnk – 2:54
 "Binary Love (Loving Hand Remix)" by The Rakes – 4:12
 "Boy From School (Erol Alkan's Extended Re-Work)" by Hot Chip – 4:48

Disc 2
 "Ice Cream" by New Young Pony Club – 3:09
 "Girlkillsbear (Lo-Fi-Fnk Remix)" by Softlightes – 4:37
 "Let My Shoes Lead Me Forward" by Jenny Wilson – 2:57
 "Loneliness Shines" by Malcolm Middleton – 4:16
 "Ladyflash (Simian Mobile Disco Remix)" by The Go! Team – 6:04
 "Let's Make Love And Listen To Death From Above" by CSS – 3:32
 "Sister Self Doubt" by The Shakes – 4:22
 "Bossy (Alan Braxe & Fred Falke Remix)" by Kelis – 5:41
 "Get Myself Into It" by The Rapture – 4:40
 "The Boy Who Ran Away (Riton Re-Rub)" by Mystery Jets – 3:58
 "Outsiders (JD Twitch & The Truffle Club's Optimo Refreak)" by Franz Ferdinand – 5:47
 "Love Train (Chicken Lips Remix)" by Wolfmother – 5:46
 "Binary Love (Loving Hand Remix)" by The Rakes – 7:54
 "I Don't Feel Like Dancin' (Erol Alkan's Carnival Of Light Rework)" by Scissor Sisters – 8:13

References

Record label compilation albums
2007 compilation albums
Modular Recordings compilation albums
Dance-rock compilation albums
Indie rock compilation albums
Dance-punk albums
Post-punk compilation albums